Mr. William Cleghorn  (1777–1860), better known locally as "Billy Conolly" was the last of the old eccentrics of Newcastle.

Life 
Mr. William Cleghorn, more generally known as "Billy Conolly" was born c. 1777 in Alnwick, Northumberland. He served his time to be a leather breeches maker, but for many years he led a wandering life, selling the ballads and stories of Cattanach of the Seven Dials, London. (Mr Cattanach was also a native of Alnwick.) He is said to have been the veritable "King of the Beggars" in St. Giles's; and at one time he was kidnapped and carried to France, and exhibited as a dwarf, being very diminutive in stature. He was liberated on complaining of his treatment to some of the authorities of a town who had come to see the English dwarf. In his latter days he earned a livelihood by selling nuts and oranges, and was well patronised by the public. Mr. William Cleghorn died on 9 August 1860 in Alnwick, aged 83.

See also 
Geordie dialect words

References

External links
Conrad Bladey's Beuk O' Newcassel Sangs

1777 births
1860 deaths
People from Alnwick
Geordie songwriters